Bab's Diary is a 1917 American silent romantic comedy film directed by J. Searle Dawley and starring Marguerite Clark. The film's scenario was written by Martha D. Foster, based on the screen story "Her Diary" by Mary Roberts Rinehart. This was the first in a trilogy of Babs films all starring Clark.

Plot
As described in a film magazine, Barbara Archibald (Clark) objects to being pushed into the background and, to give her family something to think about, declares that she is in love and is about to be married and end it all. She is amazed of the effect of her remark and thereupon invents a name for her lover and buys a photograph of a likely looking chap to impersonate him. Matters become complicated when Carter Brooks (Barrie), an old friend of the family, announces to Bab that he knows her newfound friend and promises to bring him to a party so Bab can meet him. He also volunteers to deliver an impassioned love note she penned to her imaginary sweetheart Valentine, the name she had selected for him. An actor made up like the photograph is introduced to Bab and persists in his attentions until she flees from the house. She thinks of the love note and goes to the actor's apartment to secure it. An alarm is raised and she is found by the police apparently drowning in the bathtub, into which she had fallen. Matters are straightened up at home and she is sent back to school in disgrace.

The intertitles for the film are excerpts from Bab's diary which added to its amusement.

Cast

Preservation
With no prints located in any film archives, all three of the Bab's films are now presumed lost.

See also
 List of lost films
 Bab's Burglar
 Bab's Matinee Idol

References

External links

 
 

1917 films
1917 romantic comedy films
American romantic comedy films
American silent feature films
American black-and-white films
Films directed by J. Searle Dawley
Lost American films
Paramount Pictures films
Films based on works by Mary Roberts Rinehart
1917 lost films
Lost romantic comedy films
1910s American films
Silent romantic comedy films
Silent American comedy films
1910s English-language films